= Bananas Music =

Music store in St. Petersburg, Florida

Coordinates: 27.787009°N 82.663746°W

Bananas Records
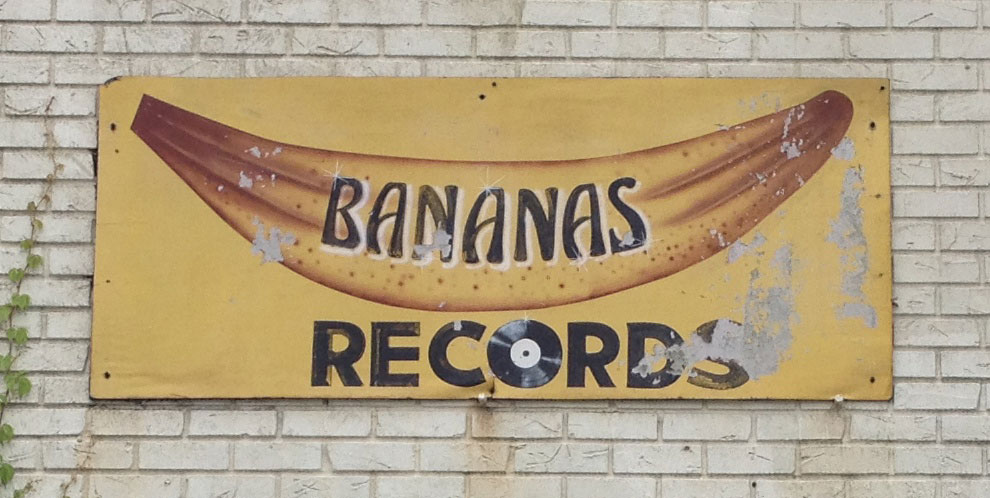
- Vintage sign at the Bananas Records warehouse
- Company type: Music retailer
- Founded: 1977
- Headquarters: St. Petersburg, Florida United States
- Owner: Michelle and Doug Allen
- Website: bananasrecords.com

Bananas Music is an American record store that operates two locations in St. Petersburg, Florida. Opened in 1977, Bananas Music unofficially claims to be the largest record store in the United States, housing over 3 million vinyl records.

== Background ==
According to the store's official website, Bananas was founded by Doug and Michelle Allen as a book store in 1977 that evolved into a record store in the ensuing years, eventually selling off its book inventory. The 6,500-square-foot warehouse, located at 2226 16th Avenue North, exclusively carries vinyl records, and unofficially claims to be the largest record store in the United States, carrying over 3 million records. In 2010, the store opened a second location nearby at 2887 22nd Avenue North that carries compact discs, DVDs, and vinyl. The location is larger than the warehouse, with over 10,000 square feet. "We saw the location on 22nd North in September and decided it was time to go back in a mainstream location," said owner Doug Allen to the Tampa Bay Times at the time. Bananas also has a 6,000 square foot warehouse for audio equipment and more stock which is located across the street from the two story warehouse.

Rolling Stone listed Bananas Music on their 2010 list of The Best Record Stores in the United States, writing, "A two-story warehouse housing nearly 3 million pieces of vinyl, this St. Petersburg monster is well named [...] Stories abound of fanatical collectors who plan vacations around all-day (or longer) excursions into its LP and 45 catacombs."
